Lake Volta, the largest artificial reservoir in the world based on surface area, is contained behind the Akosombo Dam which generates a substantial amount of Ghana's electricity. It extends from Akosombo in the south to the northern part of the country.

Geography
Lake Volta lies along the Prime meridian, and just six degrees of latitude north of the Equator. Akosombo Dam holds back both the White Volta River and the Black Volta River, which formerly converged where the middle of the reservoir now lies, to form the single Volta River. The present Volta River flows from the outlets of the dam's powerhouse and spillways to the Atlantic Ocean in southern Ghana.

The main islands within the lake are Dodi, Dwarf, and Kporve. Digya National Park lies on part of the lake's western shore.

History
The lake was formed by the Akosombo Dam, which was originally conceived by the geologist Albert Ernest Kitson in 1915, but whose construction only began in 1961 with completion in 1965. Because of the formation of Lake Volta, about 78,000 people were relocated to new towns and villages, along with 200,000 animals belonging to them.

Economy
The Akosombo Dam produces 912 MW of electricity for the country, as well as for export to Togo, Benin, and other nearby countries to earn foreign exchange. Lake Volta is also important for transportation, providing a waterway for both ferries and cargo watercraft. Since the huge lake lies in a tropical area, the water remains warm year-round naturally. Given good management, Lake Volta is the location of a vast population of fish and large fisheries.

The lake also attracts tourism, and tourist cruises visit the island of Dodi.

Recent developments include a large-scale enterprise to harvest submerged timber from the flooded forests under Lake Volta. This project harvests high-value tropical hardwood without requiring additional logging or destruction of existing forest and, according to Wayne Dunn, "could generate the largest source of environmentally sustainable natural tropical hardwood in the world." The Ghanaian-owned company Underwater Forest Resources has committed itself to making this lumber available in the global market, while Flooring Solutions Ghana have become the suppliers of hardwood floors, using the rare wood from the Lake. In addition to generating foreign currency for the region and reducing the dependence of locals on fishing as a primary economic activity, the removal of submerged trees is improving navigation on the lake and increasing safety.

An estimated 7,000 to 10,000 children work in the fishing industry on Lake Volta. The nature of their employment has been described as slavery in The Guardian and by the CNN Freedom Project. This has been described as sensationalism by Betty Mensah and the academic Samuel Okyere since many of the children and youth whose wages are given upfront to their parents grow up to become self-sufficient fishermen in adulthood who in turn hire children themselves and could therefore also be characterized as apprentices. They conclude, that many children may suffer under exploitative work but are not enslaved.

Photos

See also

Lake Kariba, the world's largest reservoir by volume

References

External links

Lake Volta & Akosombo on Ghanaweb.com
Volta Lake, International Lake Environment Committee Web site
Gold exploration in the Volta region — Objective Capital Africa Resources Investment Conference (video)
Lake Volta — more information on Ghana-Net.com

 
Volta River
Volta